Saabye is a surname. Notable people with the surname include:

August Saabye (1823–1916), Danish sculptor
Hans Egede Saabye (1746–1817), Danish priest and missionary

Danish-language surnames